Hypoptopoma joberti is a species of catfish in the family Loricariidae. It is known to inhabit rivers in South America, with specimens being collected from the Matos River in Bolivia. While ITIS lists this species as valid, FishBase considers it to be a synonym of Hypoptopoma gulare.

References 

Hypoptopomatini
Fish described in 1880